Juho Kanniainen (6 October 1875, Ii - 16 December 1929) was a Finnish farmer, lay preacher and politician. He was a member of the Parliament of Finland from 1922 to 1924, representing the Agrarian League.

References

1875 births
1929 deaths
People from Ii
People from Oulu Province (Grand Duchy of Finland)
Finnish Lutherans
Centre Party (Finland) politicians
Members of the Parliament of Finland (1922–24)